The 2001 African Junior Athletics Championships was the fifth edition of the biennial, continental athletics tournament for African athletes aged 19 years or younger. It was held in Réduit, Mauritius, from 9–12 July. A total of 41 events were contested, 21 by men and 20 by women.

Medal summary

Men

Women

References

Results
African Junior Championships 2001. World Junior Athletics History. Retrieved on 2013-10-13.

African Junior Athletics Championships
African U20 Championships
International athletics competitions hosted by Mauritius
Afr
African Junior Athletics
2001 in youth sport